Steven Zhu, known mononymously as Zhu (stylized in all caps; born April 28, 1989), is an American electronic music producer and singer who has been active since the beginning of 2014, signed to Mind of a Genius Records. Until mid-2014, Zhu remained anonymous, asking to be judged by his music alone. His debut album, Generationwhy, was released on July 29, 2016 and first premiered at Coachella during his closing set in the Sahara Tent. Zhu's Coachella performance was praised, with a writer for the New York Observer suggesting that he could be "the next Daft Punk".

Early life
Zhu is of Chinese heritage and grew up in the San Francisco Bay Area. He played in jazz bands and orchestral practices at school, and later studied music during college.

Career
Zhu's first track, "Moves Like Ms Jackson", a mashup of several songs by Outkast, was released anonymously in February 2014 and was positively received by blogs and reviewers covering electronic music. Other tracks appeared on the music streaming site SoundCloud throughout February and March, followed by an EP titled The Nightday in April 2014, which earned a number 1 play of the week on Triple J.

The first single from The Nightday, titled "Faded", drew support from Pete Tong, who named it an "Essential New Tune" on his radio show on BBC Radio 1. "Faded" was released in March 2014, and quickly climbed the global charts, peaking at number 3 in Australia and the UK, and number 12 on the US Dance/Electronic chart. "Faded" was certified platinum in Australia in 2014 and was nominated for the Grammy Award for Best Dance Recording at the 57th Annual Grammy Awards.

In a November 2014 interview, Zhu's manager Jake Udell described the current music climate as "very black and white" and acknowledged that Zhu's race played a role in the decision to release and market his music anonymously, saying: "Some of us don't even know the limitations of our own prejudice. Rather than put those limitations to the test, we've created an engaging way for fans to focus on the music rather than who's behind it." Zhu stated in a February 2015 interview that "the project [ZHU] is all about art, and we try to make it about the songs and the response."

On May 15, 2015, Zhu appeared on Pete Tong's "After Hours" show and performed a 40-minute DJ mix, mostly consisting of unreleased remixes, and also announced the Nightday Collection clothing line. On November 6, 2015, Zhu released a collaborative EP titled Genesis Series. It featured appearances from Skrillex, AlunaGeorge, A-Trak, and Bone Thugs N Harmony, among others. The EP received critical acclaim for its diverse sound and diverse range of talent. "Working for It", the lead collaboration with Skrillex and THEY., reached the top 40 and was certified platinum in Australia. It also charted on the US Dance/Electronic chart.

In 2016, the single "In the Morning" was released. After his Neon City Tour, he announced that his debut album, Generationwhy, would be released on July 29, 2016, and that "In the Morning" was the first single from the album.

On June 13, 2016, Zhu released the title track, "Generationwhy", as the second single from the album.

Zhu's success carried over into 2017, where he was a featured performer in Ultra Music Festival 2017 in Miami on the live stage on March 24, 2017. His performance was positively received. Also in March, he released the single "Nightcrawler", which was followed by a second single "Intoxicate". Additionally, Zhu provided remixes of "Andromeda" by Gorillaz, "Bad and Boujee" by Migos, and "Feel It Still" by Portugal. The Man. That same year, he released his third EP, titled Stardustexhalemarrakechdreams, on August 18. The EP's lead single, titled "Dreams", is a collaboration with electronic music trio Nero. The EP's single "Chasing Marrakech" was featured by Apple in an ad for the iPhone XS and XS Max on September 14, 2018.

On April 26, 2018, Zhu released the first installment of his second studio album, Ringos Desert, as an extended play. The full album was made available five months later on September 7, comprising 14 tracks featuring Tame Impala, Majid Jordan, and Tokimonsta. An accompanying North American tour was announced in support of the album.

In 2019, Zhu released the song "Came for the Low", the music video for which featured 2020 United States presidential candidate Andrew Yang. The song was also featured in the third episode of the Marvel Cinematic Universe television series, The Falcon and the Winter Soldier, which was released onto Disney+ on April 2, 2021.

On May 14, 2020, he released the single "Only" in collaboration with Tinashe as the first single from his third studio album Dreamland 2021.

Discography

Studio albums

Extended plays

Singles

As lead artist

As featured artist

Awards and nominations

Grammy Awards

References

American electronic musicians
American dance musicians
Deep house musicians
1989 births
Living people
American musicians of Chinese descent
Because Music artists
Electronic dance music DJs
21st-century American male singers
21st-century American singers
Astralwerks artists